Legazpi City Science High School (translated in Filipino: Mataas na Paaralang Pang-agham ng Lungsod ng Legazpi and locally known as LEGASCI is a public science high school in Legazpi City, Albay, Bicol, Philippines.

Located in Bitano, Legazpi City, it provides education for junior and senior high school students. Its junior high school department offers SPSTE (Special Program in Science, Technology, and Engineering). Likewise, its senior high school offers two tracks with three strands. The academic track includes STEM (Science, Technology, Engineering, and Mathematics), ABM (Accounting and Business Management), and ICT (Information and Communications Technology) under the TVL (Technical-vocational) strand.

Legazpi City Science High School is a science high school which is funded by the Philippine government. Students of the science high school are commonly called Citinistas.

History 
The school was founded in 2004 under the name Legazpi City High School. The school became a full-fledged science high school on January 15, 2016.

School Publication 
Ang Haraya (The Idea) is the name of the publication in Filipino, while The Webbytes is in English. These publications are known for their performance in competitions in the Philippines, particularly in the Division, Regional, and National Schools Press Conference.

Varsity 
Legazpi City Science High School's varsity is called the LEGASCI Mighty Warriors, which consists of basketball and volleyball teams.

Awards and recognition 
 Overall Champion in Ibalong Festival Competition 2019

References

Education in Legazpi, Albay
Schools in Albay
Educational institutions established in 2004
Science high schools in the Philippines
2004 establishments in the Philippines